Randy Lennox is a Canadian music and media executive. He currently serves as executive chair of Elevate, the Canadian purpose-driven cultural & innovation hub, and continues to produce film and television documentaries.

He has served as president and CEO Universal Music Canada and president of Bell Media, Canada's largest record label and media company respectively, working closely with internationally renowned Canadian artists like Bryan Adams and Shania Twain and creating original content for television and film.

Lennox has been described by U2's Bono as a "music maven turned telecommunications mogul," and "a man without whom American and Canadian music would certainly not be the same" by Gene Simmons of Kiss.

Lennox is also involved with many organizations in the Canadian music scene: he is the talent chair and executive producer of Canada's Walk of Fame and served as chair of the Massey & Roy Thomson Hall's Board. In January 2019, he was named the chair of the board for the Banff World Media Festival.

Lennox has been featured four times on Toronto Life Magazine's most influential list. In 2017 he was awarded the Walt Grealis Special Achievement Award at the 2017 Juno Awards and named Canadian media executive of the year by Playback magazine.

Career

Universal Music Canada 
While at Universal, Lennox created the #1 best selling album series in Canadian history with Big Shiny Tunes, a compilation album series made in partnership with Warner Music Canada, and EMI Music Canada.

Lennox applied lessons from Big Shiny Tunes to Oh What a Feeling: A Vital Collection of Canadian Music, a Canadian-focused compilation that he assembled to celebrate the Juno Award's 25th Anniversary. The 4-disc box-set was the first-ever Canadian box-set to be certified diamond for sales of over one million copies. Lennox also partnered with CARAS for the album and together raised more than $5.3 million to fund Band-Aid and other Canadian charities.

In 1998, Universal Music Canada merged with Polygram Canada and at age 36 Lennox appointed as company's president, and then in 2001, president and CEO.

Under Lennox, Universal Music Canada signed or developed many Canadian artists Justin Bieber, Drake, Hedley, Nickelback, The Tenors, The Weeknd, Shawn Mendes and The Tragically Hip among others while working closely with long-time Canadian music icons like Shania Twain, Diana Krall, and Bryan Adams. Lennox also conceived and produced Wavin' Flag (as performed by the Canadian supergroup Young Artists for Haiti) which more than a million dollars in disaster relief funds following the 2010 Earthquake in Haiti and the 2010 Vancouver Olympic Games Anthem.

During this period Universal Music Canada was named Record Company of the Year for 16 consecutive years at Canadian Music Week.

Bell Media 
In 2015, Lennox was recruited to Bell Media as President Entertainment Production & Broadcast with a five-year mandate to "bring IP-based thinking" to Bell Media's original content production. In this role Lennox brought Bell Media into new markets with Bat Out Of Hell: The Musical and talent competition The Launch, which was picked up and expanded internationally by Sony Pictures Television.

In interviews Lennox described world-class original content as the core of his strategy, and focused Bell Media's efforts and investments in production and partnerships to secure exclusive rights to the premium international content while exporting such content to other markets.

In 2017, Lennox was appointed president of Bell Media taking responsibility for "strategy and operations for conventional, pay and specialty television, radio, digital media, out-of-home advertising and special projects."

New Formats & Content 
During Lennox's tenure Bell Media dramatically expanded the number of content formats produced, from musical theatre to musical reality tv competition and a number of documentaries. Working with Meat Loaf collaborator Jim Steinman, Lennox co-produced 2017's Bat Out Of Hell: The Musical, a stage adaptation of the 1977 album that received wide acclaim over its run in London, Toronto and New York. Meanwhile, working with Big Machine Records' Scott Borchetta, Lennox co-created and produced the original reality music competition franchise, The Launch, a new format that was subsequently picked up by Sony Pictures Television for international distribution.

Bell Media also began producing feature documentaries, many of which were produced by Lennox, including the music focused Long Time Running, which featured Tragically Hip, Home Town, a solo acoustic concert featuring Neil Young, the 2019 documentary David Foster: Off the Record. Lennox also co-produced Once Were Brothers: Robbie Robertson and The Band. The documentary, co-produced with Martin Scorsese, Ron Howard, and Brian Grazer opened 2019 Toronto International Film Festival, the first-ever opening of the festival by a Canadian documentary.

Lennox also co-produced the 2019 Clive Owen film The Song Of Names with Robert Lantos and oversaw the adaptation of The Beaverton from comedy news site to television show, as well as dramas including Cardinal, Transplant and Frontier. Working with singer-songwriter Jann Arden, in 2018 Lennox executive produced Jann, an original TV series featuring Arden playing a fictionalized version of herself. Premiering in early 2019, the first season would become "most-watched" Canadian television series and comedy of the year. In October 2020, Hulu acquired American distribution rights to the series.

Partnerships 
In line with both his original and expanded mandates, Lennox made a number of deals designed to increase Bell Media's library of exclusive content. Starting with internet radio's iHeartMedia and the Just For Laughs comedy festival, Lennox bolstered Bell Media's library with domestic and international partners that would grow to include Wow Media Unlimited, Lionsgate, and premium U.S. television brands Starz, Vice Media and BNN Bloomberg, and HBO  and HBO Max.

This increased focus on original content also saw licensing deals with streaming competitor Netflix and production for American filmmaking magnate Jeffrey Katzenberg.

In 2019, citing a scarcity of studio space in Toronto's $2 billion film and television industry, Lennox led Bell Media's majority acquisition and subsequent expansion of Toronto's Pinewood Studios. To alleviate its more than two-year backlog, Lennox led a 200,000-square foot production space expansion for Pinewood, for which began construction in November 2020.

In April 2020, Lennox and Bell Media led a coalition of 15 partners in broadcasting Stronger Together, Tous Ensemble, the largest multi-platform broadcast event in Canadian history.

Crave (formerly CraveTV) 
Lennox has described the Canadian streaming landscape as “in and of itself confused,” and that Bell Media could help, and in 2018 rebranded and relaunched the CraveTV service as Crave, a standalone subscription service and the first time Bell had ever unbundled premium content from its wireline products.

In interviews Lennox has described a responsibility to meet customer expectations, and his plan to attract new subscribers with exclusive world-class original content by producing it in house and patterning internationally. By the end of 2020, Crave had amassed nearly 3 million subscribers and was HBO Max's first international launch partner, in addition to earlier partnerships Lennox signed HBO, Starz, Showtime, Vice, TIFF and others.

Stronger Together, Tous Ensemble 
On April 22, 2020 Bell Media announced Stronger Together, Tous Ensemble, a fundraising concert in support of Food Banks Canada on April 26 became the largest broadcasting event in Canadian history. The event saw competing Canadian media companies working together and led by Bell Media to produce and deliver the disaster response special.

Conceived of and produced by Lennox, the concert featured over 80 prominent Canadian musicians, artists, activists, actors and athletes including Celine Dion, Chris Hadfield, Michael Bublé, and Drake encouraging Canadians to donate to Food Banks Canada by text. In an interview with FYI Music News, Lennox shared that the entire concert, from conception to broadcast, was assembled in just 12 days, with participants filming their own segments at home and final mastering and mixing being done the day before broadcast.

The event, broadcast simultaneously by 15 media groups on over 110 platforms, including television, radio, streaming and on demand, is the largest television event in Canadian history. In all, the 90-minute commercial-free event raised $8.6 million Food Banks Canada.

Elevate 
Effective September 1, 2021, Lennox was named Executive Chair of Elevate, a cultural & innovation hub known for its annual Innovation, Technology & Media conference. In this role Lennox advises the team on vision and strategy as well as providing mentorship.

Documentaries and Productions 
Lennox continues to produce documentaries, films, TV shows and music, drawing from his longstanding relationships in the entertainment industry.

In a pair of 2021 interviews with Playback Magazine and FYI Music News, Lennox remarked that his love for documentary and TV productions had grown to rival his love for music. He also detailed a slate of new productions:

Black and White, a documentary about Canadian jazz pianist Oscar Peterson, made with the team behind the Lennox-produced David Foster documentary.

A documentary about Canadian-American singer-songwriter Buffy Sainte Marie, titled Carry It On made in partnership with the same creative team Lennox worked with on the Robbie Robertson documentary, Once Were Brothers.

Rock & Roll Machine, a documentary about rock band Triumph.

A television series called Adult Children, made in partnership with Lionsgate, as well as Amanda Seyfried and Tom Sadoski.

An as yet-untitled documentary about the iconic Canadian-American rock band Steppenwolf in partnership with Rezolution Pictures.

Additional charitable involvement 
The Oh What A Feeling series, produced by Lennox, has raised more than $5.3 million for Canadian charities across several volumes.

Along with industry veterans Bob Ezrin and Gary Slaight, Lennox organized Young Artists for Haiti, a supergroup including Drake, Justin Bieber, Nelly Furtado and Avril Lavigne that recorded a cover of K'naan's "Wavin' Flag" as a charity single in the aftermath of the 2010 Haiti earthquake raising more than a million dollars for disaster relief.

Lennox is a director of the Smilezone Foundation, an organization that donates play zones to hospitals and paediatric care facilities, and sits on the board of CARAS MusiCounts.

Awards and recognition 

 In February 2002, MacLean's Magazine named Lennox as one of their ‘Most Influential Canadians
 On March 11, 2010, Lennox was inducted into the Canadian Music and Broadcast Industry Hall of Fame as part of Canadian Music Week 
 Also in 2010, Lennox won a Juno Award for "Single of the Year" for producing Wavin' Flag
 In 2014, Lennox was named International Label Executive of the Year by the Worldwide Radio Summit
 In November 2015, Lennox was named one of the 50 most influential people living in Toronto by Toronto Life magazine
 In January 2017 it was announced that CARAS would be presenting Lennox with the Walt Grealis Special Achievement Award at the 2017 Juno Awards in recognition of his contribution to the growth and development of the Canadian music industry
 In December 2017, Lennox was named Canadian Media Executive of the year by Playback Magazine 
In November 2019, Lennox was listed as one of the 50 most influential people living in Toronto by Toronto Life Magazine, his fourth time featured on the list

References

Canadian music industry executives
Canadian chief executives
Living people
Year of birth missing (living people)